The term High School Confidential may refer to:
High School Confidential (Jerry Lee Lewis album), an album by Jerry Lee Lewis
High School Confidential (Jerry Lee Lewis song), a song by Jerry Lee Lewis
High School Confidential (film), a 1958 film starring Mamie Van Doren with a cameo by Jerry Lee Lewis
High School Confidential (Rough Trade song), a song by Rough Trade
High School Confidential (TV series), a documentary television series on the WE: Women's Entertainment network
High School Confidential, the sole album by the short-lived band Tomcats
High School Confidential, a book by Jeremy Iversen